The Holland Heineken House is a temporary meeting place for supporters, athletes and other followers at the Summer Olympics and Winter Olympics.  There has been a Holland Heineken House at all the Olympic Games since 1992 in Barcelona, organized by Heineken and NOC*NSF.

The name Holland Heineken House was chosen due to the alliteration and for the international appearance, despite the incorrect naming of the country involved. Created with the purpose of having a place for Dutch athletes to meet fans, it was later expanded into a meeting place for supporters as well as a base of operations for NOC*NSF, companies and the media.

Editions

References

External links 

 

Heineken
Netherlands at the Olympics